Bonnie Gadusek and Helena Suková were the defending champions, but none competed this year.

Elise Burgin and Betsy Nagelsen won the title by defeating Jenny Byrne and Janine Thompson 6–2, 6–3 in the final.

Seeds

Draw

Finals

Top half

Bottom half

References

External links
 Official results archive (ITF)
 Official results archive (WTA)

WTA Swiss Open
European Open - Doubles